Y-27632 is a biochemical tool used in the study of the rho-associated protein kinase (ROCK) signaling pathways. Y-27632 selectively inhibits p160ROCK, although it does inhibit other protein kinases such as PKCs at higher concentrations.

It has been studied for its effects on corneal endothelial cells (CECs)  and cardiac stem cells (CSCs).

References

4-Pyridyl compounds
Protein kinase inhibitors